Symphyotrichum chapmanii (formerly Aster chapmanii and Eurybia chapmanii) is a species of flowering plant in the family Asteraceae native to the Apalachicola River drainage basin of Alabama and Florida. Its flowers have purple to blue-lavender ray florets and pale yellow disk florets. It is a wetland species and is of conservation concern. It may be extirpated in Alabama.

Description
Savanna aster is a perennial, herbaceous plant that grows from a cespitose root system with rhizomes. It typically reaches heights  on one to three hairless stems. It has cylinder-bell shaped involucres with green, purple-tipped phyllaries in 4–6 rows on its involucres.

Citations

References

chapmanii
Flora of Alabama
Flora of Florida
Plants described in 1841
Taxa named by John Torrey
Taxa named by Asa Gray